= Japanese drama =

Japanese drama may refer to:

- Noh, a major form of classical Japanese musical drama that has been performed since the 14th century
- Japanese television drama, referred to in Japanese as terebi dorama (テレビドラマ)
- Radio drama in Japan, often related to anime and manga series
